Diplomatic Passport (also known as Foreign Embassies) is a Canadian interview television series which aired on CBC Television from 1961 to 1962.

Premise
Episodes of this CBC Ottawa production featured interviews with ambassadors in Canada, often with their spouses, with scenes from their embassy properties.

Scheduling
This half-hour series was broadcast Mondays at 4:00 p.m. (Eastern) from 16 October 1961 to 30 April 1962.

References

External links
 

CBC Television original programming
1961 Canadian television series debuts
1962 Canadian television series endings
1960s Canadian television talk shows